The Black Spur is a road between the towns of Healesville and Narbethong in Victoria, Australia. It is also known as Black Spur Drive and is part of the Maroondah Highway.

Location
The Black Spur is located approximately 60 kilometers North-East of Melbourne on the Maroondah Highway between Healesville and Marysville.

Etymology
Originally known as "The Blacks' Spur", the road gained its name from the route that displaced Aboriginal people from northern Victoria used to take on their way to a settlement at Corranderrk near Healesville.

History 
During the mid-1890s depression the successful Melbourne photographer John William Lindt closed his studio. As early as 1883 he had been exhibiting pictures of the Blacks' Spur, where he built and moved to a guesthouse ‘The Hermitage’ in gardens set out by his friend Ferdinand von Mueller. It features New Guinea tree houses from which he made frequent panoramas of his property and surrounding primeval forest of towering, 30-metre mountain ash. There he continued his photography in a studio of 30m x 8m, with a wall glazed in ground glass. In it he photographed guests, of whom he also made outdoor portraits in the bush setting, and projected lantern slides for their entertainment.

In 1913 he collaborated with Nicholas Caire to produce a tourist booklet on the area.

Though he suffered from anti-German sentiment during and after WW1, and had to defend himself when a public meeting was called at the local shire council hall to demand that he be sent to an internment camp. Lindt continued to sell prints from his older glass negatives and from new photographs he took of his forest home, guests in his gardens, and genre scenes. Some of those prints are accessible on the sites of State Library of Victoria, State Library of New South Wales, National Gallery of Australia, National Library of Australia, and the National Gallery of Victoria.

In 2009, a large section of Black Spur was damaged during the Black Saturday bushfires.

In 2019, Angie Suryadi, a woman from Melbourne was killed on the Black Spur when a large tree fell on her family's car during strong winds. Her four year old son was injured.

Description of road
The road has undergone restoration and improvements in August 2006 and has been widened later that same year. It is twisty with a series of hairpin turns punctuated by short straights. A few corners are prone to dampness due to the ferny rainforest surroundings. The surrounding landscape has tall mountain ash trees and tree ferns, the typical of southeastern Australia's temperate rainforests.

In March 2008, the Victorian State government allocated $547,000 to improve road safety on the Black Spur. Stage 1 of the works involved reducing the speed limit from 100 km/h to 80 km/h in May 2008.

Statistics
 Length: 30km
 Corner Ratio: 80%
 Corner Speeds: 35–60 km/h
 Legal Speed Limit: 80 km/h
 Traffic: 2–5 (cars/min)
 Bumpiness: Smooth some corrugation
 Bitumen Grip: Very grippy
 Special Notes: The rainforest surroundings mean the road is often damp. There is regularly bark on the road in winter and bushfires in the area in summer.

See also

References

External links
 Motorcycle Sports Touring Club of Victoria Inc.
 Black Spur Drive – Official government tourism website
 Black Spur Motorbike Ride
 Black Spur at Google Maps.

Roads in Victoria (Australia)